Mahunkallinia is a genus of mites in the family Acaridae.

Species
 Mahunkallinia serratus Eraky, 1999

References

Acaridae